Elyes Fakhfakh (born 1972) is a Tunisian politician. He served as the Minister of Tourism and, starting on 19 of December 2012, as the Minister of Finances as well, under Prime Minister Hamadi Jebali. He served as the Prime Minister of Tunisia from 27 February to 2 September 2020.

Biography
Elyes Fakhfakh was born in Tunis in 1972. He studied Mechanical Engineering at the National Engineering School of Sfax and graduated in 1995. Then he studied Master's at the Institut National des Sciences Appliquées de Lyon. Later on, he had a Master's degree in Business Administration at University of Évry Val d'Essonne.

In 1999, at the age of 27, he started his career as an engineer for the French oil corporation Total S.A. He worked for Total in Europe, America and Asia, and from 2004 onwards in Poland. In 2004, he joined Cortrel, a Tunisian leaf spring manufacturing company, and later became its Deputy Director General.

He is a member of Ettakatol. On 20 December 2011, he joined the Jebali Cabinet as Minister of Tourism.

On 19 December 2012, he also took charge of the Ministry of Finance. He is successively assisted by two secretaries of state: Slim Besbes and Chedly Abed.

In the 2014 Tunisian parliamentary election, his party Ettakatol lost all of its previous seats. His party did even worse in the 2019 Tunisian parliamentary election by only getting 0.26 percent of the votes, and currently has no seat in the Assembly of the Representatives of the People.

He had participated in 2019 Tunisian presidential election and got 0.34% of votes in the first round.

On 20 January 2020, he was appointed head of government by President Kais Saied after consultations with all political parties, 10 days after the previous prime minister-designate, Habib Jemli, failed to gain the confidence of parliament.

The Fakhfakh government gained the confidence of parliament on 27 February 2020.

The Fakhfakh government consisted of 32 members of which six members were from Ennahda (Islamist, 54 out of 217 seats in Parliament), three from Democratic Current (social democrat, 22 MPs), two from People's Movement (15 MPs), two from Tahya Tounes (liberal, 14 MPs), one member from Tunisian Alternative (Liberal, three MPs), one from Nidaa Tounes (Liberal, three MPs) and 17 Independent Politicians.

In June 2020, according to Al Jazeera, "an independent member of Parliament published documents indicating that Fakhfakh owned shares in companies that won deals worth 44 million dinars". Fakhfakh denied any wrongdoing. On 15 July 2020, he resigned.

References

External links 

Living people
1972 births
People from Tunis
Finance ministers of Tunisia
Government ministers of Tunisia
Prime Ministers of Tunisia
Democratic Forum for Labour and Liberties politicians
21st-century Tunisian politicians
Candidates for President of Tunisia